Niazagheh (also Romanized as Nīāzāgheh; also known as Niāz Agha, Nīāz Āqā, and Nīāz Zāgheh) is a village in Malmir Rural District, Sarband District, Shazand County, Markazi Province, Iran. At the 2006 census, its population was 193, in 37 families.

References 

Populated places in Shazand County